Crystallography Reviews is a quarterly peer-reviewed scientific journal publishing review articles on all aspects of crystallography. It is published by Taylor & Francis. The editor-in-chief is Petra Bombicz
 (Research Centre for Natural Sciences, Budapest), book review editor is Alice Brink (University of Free State, Bloemfontein), advising editor is John R. Helliwell (University of Manchester), founding editor is Moreton Moore, (Royal Holloway, University of London).

Abstracting and indexing 
The journal is abstracted and indexed in:
 Chemical Abstracts Service/CASSI
 Science Citation Index Expanded
 Scopus

According to the Journal Citation Reports, the journal has a 2020 impact factor of 2.467.

References

External links
 

Quarterly journals
Chemistry journals
English-language journals
Crystallography journals
Publications established in 1987
Taylor & Francis academic journals